Sergio Mendizábal (3 July 1920 – 2005) was a Spanish film and television actor. He appeared in over 100 films and television programs, including his appearances in the films, For a Few Dollars More and The Good, the Bad and the Ugly.

Partial filmography 

 The Other Life of Captain Contreras (1955) - Party Goer (uncredited)
 The Guardian of Paradise (1955) - Client Boite (uncredited)
 Mr. Arkadin (1955) - (uncredited)
 The Big Lie (1956) - Cinematographer (uncredited)
 Tambien Hay Cielo Sobre El Mar (1956)
 Y Eligió El Infierno (1957)
 Stories of Madrid (1958) - St. Cartagena, the Councilman
 The Italians They Are Crazy (1958)
 Gil Zitelloni (1958)
 Luna de Verano (1959) - Student
 Park Retreat (1959)
 Back to the Door (1959)
 Bajo El Cielo Andaluz (1960) - Pepito Nogales
 Festival in Benidorm (1961)
 La Estatua (1961) - Don Andres
 Viridiana (1961) - El Pelon (uncredited)
 Savage Guns (1961) - Mayor
 Los Que No Fuimos A La Gurera (1962) - Mediavilla
 The Gang of Eight (1962)
 Face of Terror (1962) - Police Doctor (uncredited)
 Los Guerrilleros (1963)
 The Good Love (1963) - Friar
 From Pink to Yellow (1963) - Priest
 Una tal Dulcinea (1963)
 The Executioner (1963) - Companion of the Marquis
 A Nearly Decent Girl (1963)
 Se Necesita Chico (1963)
 The Art of Living (1965) - Comrade of Luis
 Double Edged Crime (1965) - Don Francisco
 Megaton Ye-Ye (1965)
 For a Few Dollars More (1965) - Tucumcari Bank Manager
 El Rayo Desintegrador (1966)
 Man on the Spying Trapeze (1966) - Joseph
 The Good, the Bad and the Ugly (1966) - Blonde Bounty Hunter
 Fantasy... 3 (1966) - King
 Great Friends (1967) - The Priest
 Tomorrow Will Be Another Day'' (1967) - Lord (uncredited)

References

External links 

Rotten Tomatoes profile

1920 births
2005 deaths
People from San Sebastián
Spanish male film actors
Spanish male television actors
Male Western (genre) film actors
Male Spaghetti Western actors
20th-century Spanish male actors